The Pirates of Capri, released in the United Kingdom as The Masked Pirate, is a 1949 Italian/American international co-production swashbuckler film directed by Edgar G. Ulmer starring Louis Hayward. It was filmed on location in Italy.

Plot
In Naples in 1798, foppish nobleman Count Amalfi (Louis Hayward), adviser to the Queen (Binnie Barnes), is secretly the heroic pirate Captain Sirocco, who leads a band of rebels to overthrow the aristocratic regime, dominated by villainous Police Chief Von Holstein (Massimo Serato).

Cast
 Louis Hayward as Count Amalfi/Captain Sirocco
 Binnie Barnes as Queen Carolina
 Alan Curtis as Commodore Van Diel
 Massimo Serato as Von Holstein
 Mariella Lotti as Countess Mercedes
 Mikhail Rasumny as Pepino
 Virginia Belmont as Annette
 Franca Marzi as Carla
 William Tubbs as Pignatelli

Critical reception
In a contemporary review, The New York Times wrote "the thundering noise, confusion and blood-letting of revolution comes too late to offset the pompous and dull make-believe that dominates," concluding that "Stuffy and obvious are the adjectives that best describe "The Pirates of Capri;" while more recently, TV Guide gave the film 2/4 stars, and wrote "Great action scenes and clever direction by Ulmer pull this one out of the doldrums."

References

External links
 
 
 

1949 films
1940s historical adventure films
American black-and-white films
American historical adventure films
Italian historical adventure films
Films set in the 18th century
English-language Italian films
American swashbuckler films
Films directed by Edgar G. Ulmer
Films scored by Nino Rota
Films set in Italy
Films shot in Italy
1940s American films
1940s Italian films